Iraq's rivalry with Kuwait was once considered as the Arab world's greatest football rivalry of all-time. The rivalry began in the mid-1970s. Because of the Gulf War, Iraq and Kuwait were in complete avoidance and never met for more than a decade; Iraq and Kuwait have played 37 matches against each other with 17 victories for Iraq, 10 draws, and 10 victories for Kuwait.

Major tournament matches
1972 AFC Asian Cup qualification

1972 AFC Asian Cup qualification

1976 AFC Asian Cup

Matches
Source:

Statistics

See also
Iran–Iraq football rivalry
Iraq–Saudi Arabia football rivalry

References

International association football rivalries
Kuwait national football team
Iraq national football team
Iraq–Kuwait relations